In enzymology, a 5-aminopentanamidase is an enzyme that catalyzes the chemical reaction

5-aminopentanamide + H2O  5-aminopentanoate + NH3

Thus, the two substrates of this enzyme are 5-aminopentanamide and H2O, whereas its two products are 5-aminopentanoate and NH3.

This enzyme belongs to the family of hydrolases, those acting on carbon-nitrogen bonds other than peptide bonds, specifically in linear amides.  The systematic name of this enzyme class is 5-aminopentanamide amidohydrolase. Other names in common use include 5-aminovaleramidase, and 5-aminonorvaleramidase.  This enzyme participates in lysine degradation.

References

 
 

EC 3.5.1
Enzymes of unknown structure